J. D. Scholten (born March 4, 1980) is an American paralegal, politician and retired professional baseball player from the state of Iowa. He is a member-elect to the Iowa House of Representatives for District 1. Scholten was the Democratic nominee for Iowa's 4th congressional district in the 2018 and 2020 elections.

Early life
Scholten was born in Ames, Iowa, in 1980. His family moved to Sioux City, Iowa, when he was four years old. He attended East High School in Sioux City, and played for their baseball and basketball teams. Scholten attended Morningside College, where he played college baseball as a pitcher and first baseman for three years, and then transferred to the University of Nebraska–Lincoln to pitch for the Nebraska Cornhuskers as a senior. In 2002, he led the Cornhuskers in earned run average.

Career

Professional baseball 
After graduating from college, Scholten played professional baseball, making his professional debut for the Saskatoon Legends of the Canadian Baseball League, an independent baseball league, in 2003. When the league folded during the season, he signed with the Sioux City Explorers of the American Association of Independent Professional Baseball, formerly of the Northern League. He returned to Sioux City in 2004, and then played in Belgium in 2005 before returning to Sioux City. In total, he played baseball in seven countries—the U.S., Canada, Belgium, Germany, France, the Netherlands, and Cuba.

After retiring from baseball, Scholten became a paralegal. He worked for firms in Minneapolis and Seattle that focused on intellectual property, and returned to Sioux City after the 2016 United States elections.

Politics

He lost, 50%–47% in a closer showing than expected. In January 2019, Scholten announced the formation of a nonprofit group to help low-income Iowans gain more information about the earned income tax credit.

In August 2019, Scholten announced that he would seek a rematch against King in the 2020 elections. He was unopposed in the primary election and faced Randy Feenstra, who had defeated King in the Republican primary. Scholten lost to Feenstra by a 25 point margin.

On March 16, 2022, Scholten announced his candidacy for District 1 in the Iowa House of Representatives. He was unopposed in the Democratic Party primary and the general election.

Personal life
Scholten's father, Jim, was Morningside College's baseball coach.

References

External links

 Campaign website

1980 births
Iowa Democrats
Morningside Mustangs baseball players
Nebraska Cornhuskers baseball players
Sportspeople from Ames, Iowa
Saskatoon Legends players
Sioux City Explorers players
Candidates in the 2018 United States elections
Living people
Paralegals
Candidates in the 2020 United States elections
Sportspeople from Sioux City, Iowa
Politicians from Sioux City, Iowa
Baseball players from Iowa